Star TV is a Turkish nationwide TV channel. It has been owned by Ferit Şahenk's Doğuş Media Group since 2011.

History 
Founded by Cem Uzan and Ahmet Özal in 1989 as Magic Box, Star TV is Turkey's first private TV channel. The channel started its test broadcasting on 5 May 1990. For a brief time in the early 1990s, it was called Star Magic Box because the name Star 1 was copyrighted by another media corporation. Its first logo was a blue S with a star on it before it turned to red in the early 2000s.

Star TV aired many world-known series for the first time in Turkey. Among them were The A-Team, Magnum, P.I. Simon & Simon, MacGyver, Days of Our Lives, M*A*S*H, Lassie, Murphy Brown, Perfect Strangers, Dragnet, Charles in Charge, The Jeffersons, Twin Peaks, Married... with Children, The Bold and the Beautiful, General Hospital, All My Children, Santa Barbara, Another World, Dallas, 21 Jump Street, Miami Vice, The Equalizer, Star Trek: The Next Generation, Wiseguy, Leave It to Beaver, Hunter, Who's the Boss?, Gimme a Break!, Murder, She Wrote, Mission: Impossible, Time Trax, Out of This World and Airwolf.

The channel is also the first private Turkish channel to start digital broadcasting in 1999.

In February 2004, Star TV was put on the block by Turkish savings and deposit insurance fund''s (TMSF) along with other media assets, including seven radio stations, a newspaper and another TV station of the Uzan Group, to cover debts owed to the Treasury resulting from the takeover of İmar Bankası and Adabank. TMSF put Star TV up for auction, and it's purchased by Isil Television Broadcasting Corp. of Dogan Media Group, which offered the highest bid of $306.5 m at the auction in September 2005.

Star TV was sold by Doğan Holding to the Doğuş Media Group on 17 October 2011, for $327m.

Programs

Star TV HD 
Star TV began broadcasting in HD on 29 May 2009. It's the second active HD channel in Turkey after Kanal D.

Euro Star 
The channel also broadcasts in Europe with the name Euro Star, with the difference of not broadcasting Champions League matches live. Euro Star has its own productions in addition to Star TV's productions.

References

External links 
Official website (in Turkish)

Television stations in Turkey
Television channels and stations established in 1990
1990 establishments in Turkey
Doğuş Group
Mass media in Istanbul